Highways in New York were first marked with a unified numbering system in 1924. The first routes incorporated into this system were numbered up to 34, with generally north–south routes having even numbers and generally east–west routes having odd numbers. By 1927, this numbering had been expanded into the 70s, with spurs suffixed with letters. While the advent of the U.S. Highway System in 1926 didn't initially absorb the routes that were incorporated into the system, a small renumbering was done in 1927 to avoid overlapping route numbers.

1924 System

1927 System

References

1927 in New York (state)
1927 in transport
State highways in New York (state)
History of New York (state)
Highway renumbering in the United States